Steroidal alkaloids have the basic steroidal skeleton with nitrogen-based functional groups attached to the skeleton. More specifically, they are distinguished by their tetracyclic cyclopentanoperhydrophenanthrene skeleton that marks their close relationship with sterols. They fall in two major categories: Solanum alkaloids and Veratrum alkaloids. A Steroidal alkaloid has also been found in Chonemorpha fragrans (Frangipani vine), 'chonemorphine' was used to treat intestinal infections in Wistar rats. (Chatterjee DK et al (1987) Parasitol Res 74, 1, 30-33).

Solanum alkaloids 
These compounds generally appear as their corresponding glycoside in plants of the genus Solanum. Solanum includes plants like potatoes, tomatoes, and various nightshades Starting with cholesterol, the biosynthesis of these compounds follow a similar general mechanism including hydroxylation, oxidation, and transamination before differentiating. Alkaloids found in these plants include chaconine, solanine, solasodine, tomatidine, tomatine, and solanidine. The Itkin group has found several of the biosynthetic gene clusters for these. In Itkin et al. 2011 and Itkin et al. 2013 they find several BSGs for α-tomatine in tomato and α-solanine in potato. Typically they are used in plants as a protection mechanism against animals. Due to the typical anti-cholinesterase activity, they can be used as poisons against the plants' predators. They can be used as starting materials for steroidal drugs. There are various tests for identifying these alkaloids. The characteristic test involves dissolving the compound in hot amyl alcohol or ethanol and watching for the formation of a jelly-like product as the mixture cools.

Veratrum alkaloids 
True to their name, Veratrum alkaloids come from plants of the genus Veratrum. Alkaloids are found in the roots and rhizomes of these plants. They include veratridine, cyclopamine, and jervine. Because of their actions on the cardiovascular, neuromuscular, and respiratory systems, Veratrum alkaloids have been used for the treatment of various conditions like myasthenia gravis, hypotension, and eclampsia.

Bioactivity 
Steroidal alkaloids have been investigated for a wide range of potential bioactivities including antimicrobial, anti-inflammatory, anti-estrogenic, and chemotherapeutic activity. These bioactivities are the result of a wide array of mechanisms across different compounds. For example, solasodine antimicrobial bioactivity is accomplished by interfering with the synthesis of genetic substances in Saccharomyces cerevisiae and Prototheca wickerhamii. Solasodine inhibits growth signaling in Geim original algal. On the other hand, tomatidine synergistically works with aminoglycosides as antibiotics against S. aureus.

Antiinflammation is similarly accomplished with a variety of mechanisms. Solasodine, for example, reduces interleukin-2 and -8 production whereas tomatidine inhibits specific nuclear translocation, JNK activation, as well as induce nitrous oxide synthase. Lastly, nine steroidal alkaloids have significant antiestrogenic activity whereas seven inhibit estrone sulfatase.

However, in addition to their therapeutic benefits, steroidal alkaloids, specifically veratrum alkaloids, are potentially deadly.

Veratrum alkaloid compounds act by attaching to voltage-gated sodium ion channels, altering their permeability.  Veratrum alkaloids cause affected sodium channels to reactivate 1000x slower than unaffected channels.  Furthermore, veratrum alkaloids block inactivation of sodium channels and lower their activation threshold so they remain open even at resting potential.  As a result, sodium concentrations within the cell rise, leading to increased nerve and muscle excitability.  These biochemical channels cause muscle contractions, repetitive firing of the nerves and an irregular heart rhythm caused by stimulation of vagal nerves which control the parasympathetic functions of the heart, lungs and digestive tract.

References